Ocacia was an international smooth jazz studio and performance group. In 2014 name was adopted by a UK clothing brand based in South Africa.

Music
Ocacia is known for its socially conscious lyrics.  The music is characterized by some as "escapist" in the usage of space, chords and ethnic overtones.  The chord structure has an absences of "thirds" and is similar to other African Diaspora and African classical music by its “drum and bass” dominance. Not all the music fits into the smooth jazz canon, as some of it is more in the film score world. Their first album was released in 1999.  The original members of the group were Owen 'Alik Shahadah (Piano/keyboards), Natasha Odlum-Shahadah (voice), David Hadley (Bass), Brian McCooke (drums).  In 2002, Natasha Odlum left the group and Nadia Kanouche became the new lead feature vocalist.  Ocacia works as a studio group composing soundtracks and is also known to work with other artists such as Sona Jobarteh and M.K. Asante Jr.

The name Ocacia is an African name derived from acacia.

Selected track list
 If I...
 Tear for the World
 Crossing the Teneire
Netsante
Give me the day
Come into the sunshine
Absent Sun

Discography

Albums

References

External links
 Ocacia Clothing Brand
 St Lucia Jazz Festival History
 

British jazz ensembles

ja:フォープレイ